Lovisa Adelaïde Ehrnrooth  (17 January 1826 – 31 May 1905) was a Finnish feminist and writer. Adelaïde Ehrnrooth was born in Nastola, one of the 16 children of an aristocratic family. She was born to Gustaf Adolf Ehrnrooth, a hero of the Finnish War. John Casimir Ehrnrooth was her brother. Adelaïde Ehrnrooth never married, and dedicated her life to helping the women and the poor. 

She was the founder of the Finnish Women's Association— the first society for women's suffrage in Finland. She was also active in the Union Kvinnosaksförening (Women's Cause Association) in 1884 and the years after 1892, until her death in Helsinki. Helena Westermarck called her "Finland's first woman journalist."

Adelaïde Ehrnrooth proposed voting rights for women in 1869.

Aside from her activist life and writing poetry, Adelaïde Ehrnrooth wrote travel accounts of her frequent journeys.

Legacy 
Ehrnrooth's life was documented by biographer Helena Westermarck in Adelaïde Ehrnrooth.


Bibliography

Poetry
Sagor och minnen (1863)
Gråsparven (1868)

Novels
Bilder ur familjekretsarna i Finland (1866; Pictures from Life in Finland)
Bland fattiga och rika (1887; Among Rich and Poor)
Dagmar: En hvardaghistoria (1870; Dagmar: An everyday story)
Tiden går och vi med den (1878; Time Passes and We With It)
Hvardagslifvets skuggor och dagar (1881; Shadows and lights of everyday life)

Political
I dagens intressanta samhällsfrågor, röst från en icke röstheråttigad (1882; On interesting social questions of the day: Vote for someone not entitled to vote)

Travel Books
Två finskors lustvandringar i Europa och Afrika åren 1876–77 och 1884 (1886; Two Finnish women's pleasure trips in Europe and Africe, 1876–77 and 1884)
Resor i Orenten (1890; Travels in the Orient)

References

Further reading

External links
 Ehrnrooth, Adelaïde in Biografiskt lexikon för Finland .
 Ehrnrooth, Adelaïde in Uppslagsverket Finland .

1826 births
1905 deaths
People from Nastola
People from the Grand Duchy of Finland
Swedish-speaking Finns
19th-century Finnish nobility
Finnish writers
Finnish feminists
19th-century Finnish writers
Finnish women's rights activists
19th-century Finnish women writers
19th-century Finnish journalists
20th-century Finnish nobility
19th-century women journalists